Beldibi is a town in  Marmaris district of  Muğla Province, Turkey. It is situated in Marmaris national park. At  it is on Turkish state highway  and merged to Marmaris . The population is of Beldibi is 8959  as of 2011. According to statistics during the last 25 years the population has increased 10 fold. The Beldibi was flourished especially after 1995 and in 1999 it was declared as a seat of township. Being merged to Marmaris some residents of the town work in touristic facilities and other urban services. Beehiving is another profitable sector.

References

Populated places in Muğla Province
Mediterranean Region, Turkey
Towns in Turkey
Marmaris District